The Diocese of Isola was a Roman Catholic diocese in Italy, located in Isola di Capo Rizzuto, Crotone, Reggio Calabria in the ecclesiastical province of Santa Severina.

History
1114: Established as Diocese of Isola (Insulensis)
27 Jun 1818: Suppressed (to Diocese of Crotone)
1968: Restored as Titular Episcopal See of Isola (Insulensis)

Ordinaries

Benedetto, O.S.A. (28 May 1451 – 23 Jul 1451 Appointed, Bishop of Dragonara) 
. . . 
Bonadias de Nigronibus (4 Jun 1479 – 1487 Died) 
Angelo Castalsi (28 Feb 1488 – 1508 Died) 
Cesare Lambertini (22 Sep 1508 – 8 Jun 1545 Resigned) 
Tommaso Lambertini (8 Jun 1545 – 1550 Died) 
Onorato Fascitelli, O.S.B. (30 Jan 1551 – 1562 Resigned) 
Annibale Caracciolo (4 May 1562 – 1605 Died)
Scipione Montalegre (1605 – 1609 Died) 
Girolamo Palazzuoli (11 Jan 1610 – 1614 Died) 
Andrea Giustiniani, O.P. (24 Nov 1614 – 27 Nov 1617 Died) 
Giovanni Antonio Massimo (12 Feb 1618 – Feb 1622 Died) 
Ascanio Castagna (8 Aug 1622 – 16 Dec 1627 Died) 
Alessandro Bichi (5 May 1628 – 9 Sep 1630 Appointed, Bishop of Carpentras)
Francesco Bibilia (8 Jan 1631 – 1634 Died) 
Martino Alfieri (21 Aug 1634 – 11 Apr 1639 Appointed, Archbishop of Cosenza)
Giuliano Viviani (2 May 1639 – Nov 1640 Died) 
Antonio Celli, O.P. (16 Sep 1641 – 1645 Died)
Domenico Carnevale (19 Feb 1646 – 12 Dec 1646 Died) 
Giovanni Battista Morra (1 Jul 1647 – Oct 1648 Died)
Giovanni Francesco Ferrari (2 May 1650 – 1659 Died) 
Carlo Rossi (bishop) (1 Sep 1659 – 9 Sep 1679 Died) 
Francesco Megale (27 Nov 1679 – 4 Nov 1681 Died)
Francesco Martini (Marini) (25 May 1682 – Oct 1715 Died) 
Domenico Votta (20 Dec 1717 – Jun 1722 Died) 
Pierluigi del Mayo (23 Sep 1722 – 2 Apr 1749 Resigned) 
Giuseppe Lancellotti, O.F.M. Conv. (5 May 1749 – 18 Jan 1766 Died) 
Michael Angelo Monticelli (21 Jul 1766 – 15 May 1798 Died)

See also
Catholic Church in Italy

References

Former Roman Catholic dioceses in Italy